Centralia is an unincorporated community located in Chesterfield County, Virginia. The community is situated at the intersection of Virginia State Route 145 and State Route 144. It was so named because it was located at the midpoint of the old Richmond and Petersburg Railroad, later the Atlantic Coast Line Railroad and today owned and operated by CSX. 

A historical marker was erected in 2014 by The Department of Historic Resources which says:

"In 1867, the African American members of nearby Salem Baptist Church separated and founded Salem African Baptist Church. The new congregation held worship services under a brush arbor before constructing a building here on a one-acre tract deeded in 1869 by members of the mother church. The congregation soon changed its name to First Baptist Church (Centralia). Early in the 20th century, members erected a large new sanctuary incorporating elements of the Gothic Revival and Colonial Revival styles. Razed by fire in 1996, this structure was rebuilt to original specifications in 1997, In 1963, the growing congregation moved two miles east."

References 

Unincorporated communities in Chesterfield County, Virginia
Greater Richmond Region
Unincorporated communities in Virginia